was a velodrome located in Yokohama that conducted pari-mutuel Keirin racing - one of Japan's four authorized  where gambling is permitted.

Kagetsu-en's oval was 400 meters in circumference. A typical keirin race of 2,025 meters consisted of five laps around the course.

Kagetsu-en closed on March 31, 2010.

External links
Kagetsu-en Keirin Home Page (Japanese)
keirin.jp Kagetsu-en Information (Japanese)

Defunct sports venues in Japan
Velodromes in Japan
Sports venues in Yokohama
Cycle racing in Japan
Sports venues completed in 1950
1950 establishments in Japan
2010 disestablishments in Japan